NIMT may refer to:

Namibian Institute of Mining and Technology
North Island Main Trunk, a railway line in New Zealand